Tupčina, together with Donji Oštrc and Gornji Oštrc form the settlement (naselje) of Oštrc, and belong to the municipality of Žumberak.

Tupčina also includes the hamlets: Duralije i Jankovići. 

Tupčina had 49 inhabitants according to the census in 2011.  

Tupčina belongs to the parish of Oštrc, which was founded in 1827.

References

Populated places in Zagreb County